Prunus polystachya, also called bat laurel, is a species of plant in the family Rosaceae. It is endemic to Singapore.

Appearance 

References 

 (Hook.f) Kalkman Prunus polystachya Retrieved on 11 May 2019

Flora of Singapore
polystachya
Least concern plants
Taxonomy articles created by Polbot